Ahmad "Sauce" Gardner (born August 31, 2000) is an American football cornerback for the New York Jets of the National Football League (NFL). He played college football at Cincinnati and was selected fourth overall by the Jets in the 2022 NFL Draft.

Early years
Gardner was born on August 31, 2000, in Detroit, Michigan. He attended Martin Luther King Jr. Senior High School, where he played wide receiver and cornerback on their football team. In the Division 2 State Championship, Gardner caught four passes for 126 yards and two touchdowns. After the season, Gardner was named an All-State selection at defensive back by the Associated Press. A three-star recruit, he committed to play college football at the University of Cincinnati.

College career
In 2019, his true freshman season, Gardner played in 11 games. He had 31 tackles and three interceptions, two of which he returned for touchdowns. He also tallied 11 passes defended and eight pass breakups. After the season, Gardner was the only true freshman named to the American Athletic Conference first-team. As a sophomore in 2020, Gardner began the season atop the depth chart as a starter. As a junior, Gardner was voted to the 2021 College Football All-America Team and named the AAC Defensive Player of the Year en route to helping Cincinnati become the first Group of Five team to reach the College Football Playoff. He declared for the 2022 NFL Draft following the season.

Professional career

Gardner was selected fourth overall by the New York Jets in the 2022 NFL Draft. He signed his four-year rookie contract, worth $38.7 million fully guaranteed, on May 7, 2022.

Gardner made his first career interception in Week 5 against the Miami Dolphins. In Week 7, he had 10 tackles and three pass breakups against the Denver Broncos, earning AFC Defensive Player of the Week. He started in all 17 games as a rookie. He finished with 75 total tackles (51 solo), two interceptions, and 20 passes defensed. His 20 passes defended led the league. Gardner was selected for the 2023 Pro Bowl Games, joining Tariq Woolen of the Seattle Seahawks as the only rookies selected. He was also named a first-team All-Pro after the season's conclusion, becoming the first rookie cornerback to achieve the honor since Ronnie Lott in 1981. He was named to the PFWA All-Rookie Team. Gardner earned the Defensive Rookie of the Year Award.

NFL career statistics

Personal life
Gardner took the nickname "Sauce", from a youth football coach at age six due to his ability on the field and his affinity for dipping sauces. In 2022, he partnered with the sports bar chain Buffalo Wild Wings to endorse a sweet and spicy barbecue sauce known as the "Sauce sauce".

Notes

References

External links

New York Jets bio
Cincinnati Bearcats bio

2000 births
Living people
Martin Luther King High School (Detroit) alumni
Players of American football from Detroit
American football cornerbacks
Cincinnati Bearcats football players
All-American college football players
New York Jets players
American Conference Pro Bowl players
National Football League Defensive Rookie of the Year Award winners